The City Council is the governing body of the City of Reykjavík, composed of representatives elected by the inhabitants of the city. The council Municipality is responsible for enforcing the issues which that the State has delegated to local authorities.

City Council appoints a mayor and appoints committees under its authority responsible for the daily operations of the city. There are fifteen members of the council and elections are held during the Icelandic Municipal elections every four years. Meetings of the City Council take place on the first and third Tuesday of each month.

Authority 
According to Article 8 of Icelandic municipal laws, the Reykjavík Council is in charge of legislation regarding city affairs and the financial budget for implementation of projects. The council appoints a mayor who serves as the chief executive of the Reykjavik city council.

Election result 2022 
The 2022 council elections were held on Saturday May 14th. The results meant that the previous ruling coalition (S+C+P+V) lost it's majority. The Progressive Party had the largest increase in votes, going from 0 to 4 council seats. Unofficial talks about forming new coalitions started on Monday May 16th and the negotiations are expected to last up to a few weeks.

Election result 2018

Former majorities

Current majorities

References 

Government of Iceland
City councils